Walter Giller (23 August 1927 – 15 December 2011) was a German actor. He was very successful in the 1950s and 1960s, when he was often seen as a comedic leading man. One of his most successful and more serious roles was in Roses for the Prosecutor.

Giller was born in Recklinghausen. In 1956, he married actress Nadja Tiller; they had two children and appeared together in a number of films. The couple resided in Lugano, Switzerland for many years. In 2009, he was diagnosed with lung cancer. He underwent a major (but unsuccessful) operation. He died in Hamburg in 2011, aged 84.

Selected filmography

 Artists' Blood (1949)
 Kein Engel ist so rein (1950)
 The Girl from the South Seas (1950) .... Lothar
 Insel ohne Moral (1950) .... Dicky
 Falschmünzer am Werk (1951) .... Conny Hauser
 Die Frauen des Herrn S. (1951) .... Platon
 Sensation in San Remo (1951) .... Ernst
 Wildwest in Oberbayern (1951) .... 2.Aufnahmeleiter Schmittchen
  (1951) .... Thomas
 The Colourful Dream (1952) .... Benno
 The Thief of Bagdad (1952) .... Ommar
 Der Mann in der Wanne (1952)
 Weekend in Paradise (1952) .... Ewald Bach
 The Day Before the Wedding (1952) .... Schurisch
  (1953) .... Fritz Schromm
 Scandal at the Girls' School (1953) .... Paul Heller
 Irene in Trouble (1953) .... Dr. Konrad Berko
 Southern Nights (1953) .... Thomas
 Secretly Still and Quiet (1953) .... Peter Vondenhoff
 Hit Parade (1953) .... Walter Lorenz
 The Great Lola (1954) .... Dr. Hugo Bendler
 She (1954) .... Ypsilon
 Ten on Every Finger (1954) .... Fips
 Music, Music and Only Music (1955) .... Karl Zimmermann
  (1955) .... Rolf
 The Three from the Filling Station (1955) .... Fritz
 Charley's Aunt (1956) .... Charley Sallmann
 The Bath in the Barn (1956) .... Peter Korff
 Ich und meine Schwiegersöhne (1956) .... Fred Windberg
 Black Forest Melody (1956) .... Luggi
 The Captain from Köpenick (1956) .... Willy Wormser
 Das Sonntagskind (1956) .... Bosty Mc. Millar
 Was die Schwalbe sang (1956) .... Rudi Winter, Student
  (1956)
 Spy for Germany (1956) .... Billy Cole
 Der schräge Otto (1957) .... Otto Schräge
 Das Glück liegt auf der Straße (1957) .... Felix Rabe
  (1957) .... Rolli
 The Big Chance (1957) .... Walter Gerber
 Drei Mann auf einem Pferd (1957) .... Erwin Tucke
 Spring in Berlin (1957) .... Peer Peterson
 Two Hearts in May (1958) .... Ralf Siedler
 Voyage to Italy, Complete with Love (1958) .... Hans Fichte
 Peter Voss, Thief of Millions (1958) .... Bobby Dodd
 Arena of Fear (1959) .... Dody, Musical-Clown
  (1959) .... Daniel Mogge
 Du rififi chez les femmes (1959) .... Clochard (uncredited)
 Bobby Dodd greift ein (1959) .... Bobby Dodd
 Roses for the Prosecutor (1959) .... Rudi Kleinschmidt
 Peter Voss, Hero of the Day (1959) .... Bobby Dodd
 That's No Way to Land a Man (1959) .... Micki Flunder
  (1960) .... Just
 Ingeborg (1960) .... Ottokar
 The Nina B. Affair (1961) .... Holden
 Three Men in a Boat (1961) .... Jerome (Jo) Sommer
 Two Among Millions (1961) .... Paulchen
 Beloved Impostor (1961) .... Robert Bolle
 The Dream of Lieschen Mueller (1961) .... Autograph hunter
 The Burning Court (1962) .... Michel Boissand
  (1962) .... Tom Fleming
 Snow White and the Seven Jugglers (1962) .... Norbert Lang, Hotelier
  (1963) .... Beggar Filch
 The Conjugal Bed (1963) .... Father Mariano
 The Strangler of Blackmoor Castle (1963) .... Edgar
 Gripsholm Castle (1963) .... Kurt
  (1963) .... Polizist
 Encounter in Salzburg (1964) .... Kröner, Insurance Agent
 The Last Ride to Santa Cruz (1964) .... Woody Johnson
 Dead Woman from Beverly Hills (1964)
 Tonio Kröger (1964) .... Merchant
 Fanny Hill (1964) .... Hemingway
 Legend of a Gunfighter (1964) .... Spike Sunday
  (1965) .... Charly Bauer
 Shots in Threequarter Time (1965) .... Renato Balli
 Legacy of the Incas (1965) .... Fritz Kiesewetter
 I Am Looking for a Man (1966) .... Dr. Pleskau
 Killer's Carnival (1966) .... Karl (Vienna segment)
 The Pipes (1966) .... George Randy
 Action Man (1967) .... Maurice Labrousse
 Johnny Banco (1967) .... Inspector Jakubowski
 Love Thy Neighbour (1967) .... Forfatter Sven Gjeholm
 A Fine Pair (1968) .... Franz
 Klassenkeile (1969) .... Dr. Wagner
 The New Adventures of Snow White (1969) .... Hans I
 Gentlemen in White Vests (1970) .... Inspektor Walter Knauer
 Die Feuerzangenbowle (1970) .... Dr. Hans Pfeiffer
 Ein Käfer auf Extratour (1973) .... Ritchie
 The Maddest Car in the World (1975) .... Jean-Pierre
 Lady Dracula (1977) .... Herr Oskar
  (1995) .... Dr. Dittmers
 Mein Vater, die Tunte (2001) .... Wanda
  (2009) .... Siegfried (final film role)
 Germaine Damar – Der tanzende Stern (2011, documentary) .... Himself

References

External links
 

1927 births
2011 deaths
People from Recklinghausen
German male film actors
German male television actors
20th-century German male actors
21st-century German male actors
German Film Award winners
Deaths from lung cancer in Germany